"Edobashi Station" may also refer to Tokyo subway Nihombashi Station on Toei Asakusa Line, named "Edobashi" 1963 to 1989.

  is a passenger railway station in located in the city of Tsu,  Mie Prefecture, Japan, operated by the private railway operator Kintetsu Railway.

Lines
Edobashi Station is served by the Nagoya Line, and is located 65.3 rail kilometers from the starting point of the line at Kintetsu Nagoya Station.

Station layout
The station was consists of two island platforms serving four tracks, connected by a level crossing.

Platforms

Adjacent stations

History
Edobashi Station opened on January 1, 1917 as a station on the Ise Railway. The Ise Railway became the Ise Electric Railway on September 12, 1926, which merged with the Sangu Express Electric Railway on September 15, 1936. On March 15, 1941, the Sangu Express Electric Railway merged with Osaka Electric Railway to become a station on Kansai Express Railway's Nagoya Line. This line in turn was merged with the Nankai Electric Railway on June 1, 1944 to form Kintetsu. The station was relocated 100 meters north of its former location in June 1959.

Passenger statistics
In fiscal 2019, the station was used by an average of 5013 passengers daily (boarding passengers only).

Surrounding area 
Mie University
Mie University Hospital
Tsu City College

See also
List of railway stations in Japan

References

External links

 Kintetsu Edobashi Station 

Railway stations in Mie Prefecture
Stations of Kintetsu Railway
Railway stations in Japan opened in 1917
Tsu, Mie